The Central Block is a historic commercial building located at 321–325 S. Pierre St. in Pierre, South Dakota. The Italianate masonry building was constructed in 1884 and was one of Pierre's earliest masonry commercial buildings. It was an early work of architects Proudfoot & Bird, then of Pierre but better known for their work elsewhere. The building opened by hosting the 1884 Republican Territorial Convention Ball, which featured a performance by the Rochester Orchestra. Since its opening, the building has housed numerous businesses and offices, including those of Alice Baird, Pierre's first female doctor, and Henry R. Horner, South Dakota State Senator and Pierre City Attorney. The building is now one of the only surviving buildings from Pierre's first commercial district.

The building was added to the National Register of Historic Places on January 19, 1989.

See also
Karcher Block, another historic commercial building in the district

References

Commercial buildings on the National Register of Historic Places in South Dakota
Chicago school architecture in the United States
Buildings and structures in Pierre, South Dakota
National Register of Historic Places in Pierre, South Dakota